Brushy Creek is a stream in the U.S. state of South Dakota.

Brushy Creek was so named on account of the thick brush along its course.

See also
List of rivers of South Dakota

References

Rivers of Perkins County, South Dakota
Rivers of South Dakota